Chinique, from the Kʼicheʼ language «chinic´aj taka´aj», is a municipality in the Guatemalan department of El Quiché. In 1892 Alfred Maudslay and his wife Anne reported that the place was a small group of houses made from adobe with thatched roofs.

References

Municipalities of the Quiché Department